Achaea umbrigera is a species of moth of the family Erebidae first described by Paul Mabille in 1897. It is found on Mauritius.

References

Achaea (moth)
Moths of Mauritius
Erebid moths of Africa
Moths described in 1897